The J. W. Schaffer House is a residence in  Glendale, California. It is on the National Register of Historic Places as a work of the architect John Lautner.

Description 

The J. W. Schaffer House is on the northeast edge of the Verdugo Mountains, in the Whiting Woods neighborhood of Glendale, California.  The house, constructed in 1949, is an example of the Wrightian-influenced Mid-Century Modern architecture of master architect John Lautner. The house exhibits the modest scale and massing, horizontal emphasis, large expanses of glass, and asymmetrical plan associated with Mid-century Modern houses, along with a connection to outdoors and focus on the specific site conditions of Organic architecture.

The design worked around the existing oak trees. It makes extensive use of glass for its exterior, and is said to "feel like a newly pitched tent or a wood cabin that provides shelter and privacy without boxing out nature.
"

History
The site was originally used by the Shaffer family as a picnic ground, but later decided to live there permanently. 

The Shaffer house was restored in the 2000s and put up for sale in 2008, eventually selling in 2012 for $1.35 million.

In popular culture

The 2009 film A Single Man, directed by Tom Ford and starring Colin Firth and Julianne Moore, used the Shaffer house as George's (Firth's) residence. The interior and exterior were shown in the film.

References

Houses in Los Angeles County, California
Modernist architecture in California
Buildings and structures on the National Register of Historic Places in Los Angeles County, California